Adana Archaeology Museum is a museum in Adana that houses the historical heritage of Cilicia in a converted textile factory. It is one of the oldest archaeological museums in Turkey.

History

Adana Archaeology Museum was founded in 1919 during the French rule of Cilicia. The collection initially comprised diverse objects found by local civilians and French military personnel; an agreement with the Imperial Museum in Constantinople also allowed for the transfer of certain antiquities held in Silifke to the Adana museum. After the formation of the Republic in 1924, Alyanakzade Halil Kamil Bey from Adana was appointed as museum director and the collection was moved in 1928 to the medrese section of the defunct Cafer Pasha Mosque and then opened to the public.

The museum was moved to the building later also occupied by the Ethnography Museum at Kuruköprü in 1950. Items from the early ages of Cilicia which was discovered during the excavations carried out at Tarsus/Gözlükule (1934), Mersin/Yumuktepe (1936), Ceyhan/Sirkeli (1938) and Yüreğir/Misis (1958) in particular, were collected at the museum which eventually became filled to the brim with the ethnographic items collected by museum director Ali Rıza Yalman (Yalkın)  between 1933 and 1940. This was also the only regional museum housing items either through bought or obtained through court orders from an area covering Kahramanmaraş to Gaziantep. The museum moved to a new city-centre location on January 7, 1972.

However, in the 2010s a new, much larger Adana Museum (Turkish: Adana Müzesi) was created some miles west of the centre in the former Milli Mensucat (National Textile) factory. There it will for a museum complex with a City Museum, Museum of Agriculture, Museum of Industry, Museum of Ethnography, Children's Museum and Mosaic Museum. In 2019 the archaeology section, including a large mosaics area, was opened. Many objects formerly in the garden of the old museum are now indoors and protected from the elements. The space is huge and will expand as more of the old industry is being restored.

The Collections
The museum contains many objects from the Hittite period, such as a statue of a god on a chariot, and many steles. But objects from earlier and later periods (Neolithic, Bronze Age, Iron Age, Archaic, Roman, Byzantine, Ottoman) also abound. Roman exhibits include sarcophagi with rich garland decorations, jugs, catapult shots, inscriptions, altars and various architectural elements, glassware, ceramics and jewellery. Finds from specific excavations in the region are displayed separately. A marble sarcophagus from Tarsus depicting the Trojan wars in high relief is known as the Achilles sarcophagus. There is also a sarcophagus carved with a Medusa from the ancient city of Augusta which was submerged beneath the Seyhan Dam Reservoir, and a life-sized bronze Karataş statue from the ancient city of Magarsus in Karataş.

The museum houses the only known inscription mentioning Apollonius of Tyana from 3–4th century CE

Gallery

References

External links
 
 Newspaper article of start in 2017
 Over 450 pictures of the old and new museum

Cilicia
Museums in Adana
Archaeological museums in Turkey
Museums established in 1924